Trần Thị Hồng Nhung (born 28 October 1992) is a Vietnamese footballer who plays as a midfielder. She was the first Vietnamese women footballer playing abroad.

In May 2019, she played a semi-final match for Chonburi F.C. winning against Air Force United F.C. in the 2019 Thai Women's League. She was expected to play the final match against BG Bundit Asia. However, the final match was not organized to help the Thailand women's national football team to prepare for the 2019 FIFA Women's World Cup.

In 2019, she won the 2019 Southeast Asian Games and the 2019 AFF Women's Championship with the Vietnam women's national football team.

International goals

References

External links 
 

1992 births
Living people
Women's association football midfielders
Vietnamese women's footballers
Vietnam women's international footballers
Asian Games competitors for Vietnam
Footballers at the 2014 Asian Games
Footballers at the 2018 Asian Games
Southeast Asian Games gold medalists for Vietnam
Southeast Asian Games medalists in football
Competitors at the 2017 Southeast Asian Games
Competitors at the 2019 Southeast Asian Games
21st-century Vietnamese women
20th-century Vietnamese women